In Greek mythology Aea was a huntress of Colchis, who attracted the unwanted attention of a local river-god.

Mythology 
Aea was fell victim to the pursuit of Phasis, the river god, who desired her. She shoot her arrows at him and ran away from him, but eventually the chase wore her down. Phasis caught her and bound her on the waves. Her story was depicted on the palace walls of the king of Colchis Aeetes.

See also 
 Asteria
 Perimele

Notes

References 
 Bell, Robert E., Women of Classical Mythology: A Biographical Dictionary. ABC-Clio. 1991. .
 Gaius Valerius Flaccus, Argonautica translated by Mozley, J H. Loeb Classical Library Volume 286. Cambridge, MA, Harvard University Press; London, William Heinemann Ltd. 1928. Online version at theio.com.
 Gaius Valerius Flaccus, Argonauticon. Otto Kramer. Leipzig. Teubner. 1913. Latin text available at the Perseus Digital Library.

Women in Greek mythology
Characters in Greek mythology
Metamorphoses into terrain in Greek mythology